Emanuela Viola (born 12 January 1972) is an Italian swimmer. She competed in the women's 100 metre butterfly at the 1988 Summer Olympics.

References

1972 births
Living people
Italian female swimmers
Olympic swimmers of Italy
Swimmers at the 1988 Summer Olympics
Place of birth missing (living people)
Mediterranean Games bronze medalists for Italy
Mediterranean Games medalists in swimming
Swimmers at the 1987 Mediterranean Games
Female butterfly swimmers